WXNZ-LP (98.1 FM, "HooSkow Radio") is a radio station licensed to serve the community of Skowhegan, Maine. The station is owned by the Wesserunsett Arts Council and airs a community radio format.

The station was assigned the WXNZ-LP call letters by the Federal Communications Commission on June 24, 2014.

References

External links
 Official Website 1 (noted offline at 2021-08-29)
 Official Website 2 (noted offline 2021-08-29)
 Official Website 3
 Official Facebook Page
 Live Stream
 

XNZ-LP
XNZ-LP
Radio stations established in 2015
2015 establishments in Maine
Community radio stations in the United States
Somerset County, Maine
Skowhegan, Maine